"Nobody Knows Anything" is the 11th episode of the HBO original series The Sopranos. Written by Frank Renzulli and directed by Henry J. Bronchtein, it originally aired on March 21, 1999.

Starring
 James Gandolfini as Tony Soprano
 Lorraine Bracco as Dr. Jennifer Melfi
 Edie Falco as Carmela Soprano
 Michael Imperioli as Christopher Moltisanti
 Dominic Chianese as Corrado Soprano, Jr.
 Vincent Pastore as Pussy Bonpensiero
 Steven Van Zandt as Silvio Dante
 Tony Sirico as Paulie Gualtieri
 Robert Iler as Anthony Soprano, Jr.
 Jamie-Lynn Sigler as Meadow Soprano
 Nancy Marchand as Livia Soprano

Guest starring
 John Heard as Vin Makazian
 Karen Sillas as Debbie

Also guest starring

Synopsis
Pussy is at Jimmy Altieri's social club when the FBI raid it and find a stash of guns. Jimmy is arrested. Pussy slips out but is intercepted by an agent moments later. He is released on bail soon after. Vin Makazian tells Tony that he has heard from a good source that Pussy is an FBI informant. Tony is reluctant to believe it, but Vin points out how easily Pussy managed to get off from the raid. He further explains that Pussy's alternative was long imprisonment for selling heroin, and as a man who cares deeply for his family, he was easy to turn. Tony insists on seeing the official report with Pussy's name on it, but Vin cannot obtain it.

Pussy has stopped collecting payments because of back pain but Paulie, who sees the same doctor, has been told there is nothing wrong with Pussy's back – though the doctor adds that "no one knows anything about backs." Tony asks Dr. Melfi's opinion; back pain, she says, might be caused by stress, such as the burden of a secret. Tony tells Paulie not to act until Pussy's wire is seen, so Paulie insists that Pussy go to a bathhouse with him; Pussy refuses to undress, saying that his doctor told him that heat is bad for him. Silvio discovers that Vin owes Pussy $30,000, which he believes may be his motive to have Pussy "disappear." Tony visits Pussy at his home and questions him sympathetically. "You got anything you want to say to me?" he asks to no response. Tony is distrustful and confused; he tells Paulie he feels he is walking into walls.

Vin has a fond personal relationship with the madam of a bordello, and he is there when the police raid it. After his release from custody, Vin commits suicide by jumping off a bridge.

Jimmy is bailed out and visits Tony at his home. Tony is surprised that he was freed so soon. Jimmy asks some intrusive questions about the cash stolen from the Colombian drug dealer. Tony evades the questions, which confirm his suspicion that Jimmy is the rat: he and Pussy were arrested at the same time, and Vin's source mixed up the "two fat fucks with black hair." Pussy is no longer suspected, but he has disappeared.

Junior visits Livia. She is bitter that Tony has sold her house. She tells Junior that several capos have placed their mothers at Green Grove, and they hold meetings there. Junior instantly suspects that they are conspiring against him with Tony and decides that he has to act against him. He assigns Mikey and Chucky to find hitmen from out of town.

First appearances
 Chucky Signore: Soldier in Junior Soprano's crew and a close friend of Mikey's
 JoJo Palmice: Mikey Palmice's wife

Deceased
Vin Makazian: jumped off the Donald Goodkind Bridge on Route 1.

Title reference
The title is said twice during the episode, first by Paulie in reference to Big Pussy's back problems when he tells Tony a doctor found nothing wrong and at the end of the episode by Tony in regards to Pussy's whereabouts.

Other cultural references
 While helping Tony and Chris to move a piano Paulie mentions "He's the Jonas Salk of backs"
 Tony mentions Sammy Gravano when Silvio says he does not believe Pussy would fear prison enough to betray his friends.
 Tony brings Mario Lanza CDs for Livia.
 A.J. mentions President Bill Clinton and Monica Lewinsky.
 Paulie's Cadillac is customized with a car horn tuned to play The Godfather musical theme, "Speak Softly, Love".

Music
 The song played when Pussy's back goes out at the brothel, and Tony and Paulie help him walk out is "Walking on a Tightrope" by Johnny Adams.
 The song played when the Feds bust up a card game with Pussy and Jimmy is "The Highs Are Too High" by Johnette Napolitano.
 The song played at the Bada Bing when Pussy is released from prison is "Slide Slide" by The Hotheads. 
 The song played at Carmela's open house party near the start of the episode is "Mickey's Monkey", by The Miracles.
 The song played when Tony meets Vin Makazian at the brothel is "My Heart is Hangin' Heavy" also by Johnny Adams. 
 The song played when Tony finds out about Makazian's death at the Bada Bing is "Lick It Up" by KISS.
 The song played when Tony looks out over the bridge and into the end credits is "Manifold de Amour" by Latin Playboys.

Filming locations 
Listed in order of first appearance:

 Montclair, New Jersey
 Jersey City, New Jersey
 Satin Dolls in Lodi, New Jersey
 Beside the Raritan River in Edison, New Jersey
 West Orange, New Jersey
 Satriale's Pork Store in Kearny, New Jersey
 North Caldwell, New Jersey
 Donald Goodkind Bridge in Edison and New Brunswick, New Jersey
 Near the Pulaski Skyway in Jersey City, New Jersey

References

External links
"Nobody Knows Anything"  at HBO

The Sopranos (season 1) episodes
1999 American television episodes

fr:La Balance (Les Soprano)